Tadeusz Rybak (October 7, 1929 – March 7, 2017) was a Polish Roman Catholic bishop. He served as the first Bishop of the Diocese of Legnica between 1992 and 2002; he was also titular bishop of Benepota between 1977 and 1992.

Ordained to the priesthood in 1953, Rybak served as auxiliary bishop of the Roman Catholic Archdiocese of Wrocław from 1977 to 1992; he then served as bishop of the Roman Catholic Diocese of Legnica from 1992 to 2002. He was also titular bishop of the diocese of Benepota, having been appointed on 28 April 1977.

Following the attempted assassination of John Paul II in 1981, Tadeusz would ordain a class of Salvatorian seminarians on the 100th anniversary of the founding of the S.D.S. in the town of Trzebnica.

Tadeusz died on 7 March 2017. He is buried at the Cathedral of Saint Apostles Peter and Paul in Legnica.

Notes

1929 births
2017 deaths
People from Milanówek
John Paul II Catholic University of Lublin alumni
20th-century Roman Catholic bishops in Poland